Cromwell's House  may refer to:

Cromwell's Other House, one of the two chambers of the Parliaments that legislated for England and Wales, Scotland and Ireland
Oliver Cromwell's House, Cromwell's family home in Ely, Cambridgeshire